Marc Larimer (December 28, 1890 – February 6, 1919) was an American fencer. He competed in the individual foil and épée events at the 1912 Summer Olympics.

References

External links
 

1890 births
1919 deaths
American male épée fencers
Olympic fencers of the United States
Fencers at the 1912 Summer Olympics
Sportspeople from Wichita, Kansas
American male foil fencers